Sorry I Make You Lush is a studio album by Luke Vibert, released under the alias Wagon Christ. It was released in 2004 on Ninja Tune. The CD version includes a QuickTime video of "Receiver".

Critical reception
At Metacritic, which assigns a weighted average score out of 100 to reviews from mainstream critics, the album received an average score of 75% based on 11 reviews, indicating "generally favorable reviews".

Jonathan Zwickel of Pitchfork gave the album a 7.8 out of 10, describing it as "an extremely listenable, laughable album, a futuristic freakshow of deep, stirring melodies and innovative beat arrangements." John Bush of AllMusic gave the album 4 stars out of 5, commenting that "Vibert's interplay of beats and melodies is fascinating by itself."

Track listing

Charts

References

External links
 
 Sorry I Make You Lush at Ninja Tune

2004 albums
Luke Vibert albums
Ninja Tune albums
Ambient breakbeat albums
Trip hop albums by English artists